Hum Tum may refer to the following:
 Hum Tum (film), 2004 Indian Hindi-language romantic comedy film
 Hum Tum (album), 1995 album by Pakistani band Vital Signs
 Hum Tum (2010 TV series), 2010 Pakistani television serial 
 Hum Tum (2022 TV series), 2022 Pakistani Ramadan special
 Hum Tum Aur Ghost, 2010 Indian Hindi supernatural comedy-drama film 
 Hum Tum Pe Marte Hain, 1999 Indian Hindi-language romantic comedy film 
 Hum Tum Shabana, a 2011 Indian romantic comedy film